Udea lagunalis is a moth in the family Crambidae. It is found in Costa Rica.

References

Moths described in 1913
lagunalis